The 2010 Formula Palmer Audi season was the thirteenth and final Formula Palmer Audi season. It began at Brands Hatch on 8 May and finished at Silverstone Circuit on 17 October. It consisted of twenty rounds, all held in England. The champion driver received a £100,000 scholarship prize, double last year's prize money, towards a drive in the 2011 FIA Formula Two Championship. On top of that, the top six finishers in the final drivers' standings were all granted an official Formula Two test.

The scholarship prize went to Nigel Moore, as he overhauled the long-time leader of the championship Maxime Jousse on dropped scores; Jousse having scored four more points than Moore on overall scores. Whereas Moore could drop two retirements for no points loss, Jousse had to drop a finish of seventh place along with a retirement and turned a four-point advantage into a nine-point deficit to Moore, having won six races to Moore's three. Third place went to Spanish driver Ramón Piñeiro, having taken four wins in the last seven races of the season to enable him to move him up from sixth to his eventual placing of third. Kieran Vernon and José Alonso Liste battled over fourth place, with Vernon coming out on top by two points after his third win of the season – to go with his double at the second Brands Hatch meeting – in the series' final race at Silverstone, ahead of Alonso Liste. Other winners during the season were Melroy Heemskerk at the first Brands Hatch meeting, Max Snegirev at Croft and Jordan Williams, who won at Snetterton before an accident with Jousse in the next race left him without funds to complete the season.

In November 2010, series boss Jonathan Palmer announced the end of the series with the series' chassis being dismantled for use in other areas of the MotorSport Vision organisation.

Driver lineup

Race calendar and results
 All races were held in the United Kingdom.

Championship standings

References

External links
Official Formula Palmer Audi Website

Formula Palmer Audi
Formula Palmer Audi seasons
Palmer Audi